The West End (Shuswap language: Tk'emlul̓pe) is a South Shore neighbourhood of Kamloops, British Columbia in Canada. It is the city's oldest residential neighbourhood and has the largest proportion of heritage-designated homes.

Geography 

The West End, located on Kamloops' South Shore (i.e., south of the Thompson River), is generally considered to be the area of Kamloops bounded to the East by 2nd Avenue, to the West by Summit Drive, to the North by Victoria Street West and to the South by Columbia Street.
The neighbourhood is not necessarily regarded as the western end of Kamloops itself (the Brocklehurst area of the North Shore lies further to the West), but rather as the western end of the downtown area. Almost the entire West End is zoned residentially and is not home to more than a few businesses.

Topography 

The West End is relatively one of the lowest areas of Kamloops, located far below Aberdeen Hills, but the neighbourhood itself is very hilly. Nicola Street West and Clarke Street slope considerably to the west of Lee Road, while Battle Street Hill carries the central and northern portions of the neighbourhood significantly upward toward the College Heights area below Thompson Rivers University.
Also notable are the large number of tall, broad deciduous trees planted in yards and along boulevards in the neighbourhood. These contribute to making the West End one of the greenest and shadiest areas of the city.

History and Heritage 

During Kamloops' evolution in the 19th century, the West End was the main site of residential settlement in the growing town. The name of Nicola Wagon Road in the neighbourhood bears witness to the fact that the West End was the first concentration of inhabitation in what would become one of British Columbia's most spread-out cities.

The West End was home to many of Kamloops' most prominent early citizens, as demonstrated by the size and grandeur of many of the homes. While a number of more modern houses have encroached upon the neighbourhood's elegant atmosphere, wood-panelled and stucco homes remain the norm.

Additional 
The neighbourhood is located close to a number of significant Kamloops buildings, including the Old Courthouse, Sacred Heart Cathedral, St. Andrew's on the Square, Stuart Wood Elementary School (the city's first school), the Kamloops Museum and Archives and St. Ann's Academy.

External links 
City of Kamloops

Neighbourhoods in Kamloops